Chortitz is a hamlet in Coulee Rural Municipality No. 136, Saskatchewan, Canada. Listed as a designated place by Statistics Canada, the hamlet had a population of 26 in the Canada 2006 Census. The hamlet is located on Highway 379, about 25 km south of Swift Current.

Demographics 

See also

 List of communities in Saskatchewan
 Hamlets of Saskatchewan

References

Designated places in Saskatchewan
Unincorporated communities in Saskatchewan
Coulee No. 136, Saskatchewan